Passatelli are a pasta formed of bread crumbs, eggs, grated Parmesan cheese, and in some regions lemon, and nutmeg; it is typically cooked in chicken broth. Typically, it is found in Pesaro e Urbino province (northern Marche), Ancona province (central Marche) and other regions of Italy, such as Emilia Romagna and Umbria.

Passatelli is made by passing the dough through a potato ricer, often into a boiling broth.

See also

 List of Italian dishes
 List of pasta
 Spätzle

References

Pasta dishes
Types of pasta
Cuisine of Emilia-Romagna
Cuisine of Marche
Cuisine of Umbria

fr:Cuisine romagnole#Passatelli